Liège is a parliamentary constituency in Belgium used to elect members of the Chamber of Representatives since 1831. It corresponds to the province of Liège.

The constituencies for the Chamber of Representatives are set by Article 87 of the Electoral Code of 1894. The number of representatives per constituency is set every ten years based on population numbers. The current distribution of representatives is set by royal order of 31 January 2013.

Representatives

1831–2003

1999: 10 seats

2003–

References

Constituencies of the Chamber of Representatives (Belgium)